Matthew Conger (born 11 October 1978) is a New Zealand football referee from Palmerston North. Born in Texas, United States, Conger operates in the Australian A-League and the New Zealand Football Championship. He is also a school teacher in Palmerston North.

Refereeing career
Conger began refereeing in the United States as a teenager, continuing after moving to New Zealand in his early 20s.

Conger has refereed at the 2015 Under-20 World Cup in New Zealand, the 2016 Olympic Games in Rio de Janeiro, the 2017 Under-20 World Cup in South Korea, the 2018 FIFA World Cup in Russia, and the 2022 FIFA World Cup in Qatar. He has also officiated in numerous A-League and New Zealand Football Championship games. He has also been the man in the middle for OFC Champions League games.

In 2016, Conger left full-time teaching in order to concentrate more on his refereeing, but in 2017 was engaged part-time at Palmerston North's Carncot School.

In 2017, Conger was named the New Zealand referee of the year.

FIFA World Cup

References

1978 births
Living people
New Zealand association football referees
A-League Men referees
New Zealand schoolteachers
2018 FIFA World Cup referees
2022 FIFA World Cup referees
FIFA World Cup referees
Football referees at the 2016 Summer Olympics